Al-Azhar Al-Sharif is an Islamic scientific body and the largest religious institution in Egypt. Its headquarters is located in the building of the Sheikhdom of Al-Azhar in the center of the Egyptian capital, Cairo. The history of the establishment of the Al-Azhar Mosque dates back to the year 972 by the Fatimid Caliph Al-Muizz Li-Din Allah. It is considered the third oldest university in the world after Al-Zaytoonah and Al-Qarawiyyin universities.

The Al-Azhar institution in its current form was reorganized according to Law No. 10 of 1911, amended by Law No. 32 and 33 of 1923, and then Law No. 103 of 1961, which stipulated that Al-Azhar is the major Islamic scientific body based on the preservation and study of Islamic heritage, and it has an independent moral personality, headed by it. It is led by the Grand Imam of al-Azhar, currently Ahmed el-Tayeb, and consists of several basic bodies.

Affiliated bodies 
 Al-Azhar Mosque
 Al-Azhar University
 Islamic Research Academy.
 The Supreme Council of Al-Azhar
 Azhar institutes
 Al-Azhar Library
 Al-Azhar magazine

Grand Imam of al-Azhar 
Is a prestigious and a prominent official title in Egypt. He is considered by some Muslims to be the highest authority in Sunni Islamic thought and Islamic jurisprudence and holds great influence on followers of the theological Ash'ari and Maturidi traditions worldwide. The Grand Imam heads the Al-Azhar Al Sharif, al-Azhar Mosque, and by extension al-Azhar University, and is responsible for official religious matters along with the Grand Mufti of Egypt.

Religious ideology 

Historically, Al-Azhar had a membership that represented diverse opinions within Islam. The theological schools of Al-Ashari and Al-Maturidi were both represented.  It has a long tradition of teaching all four schools of Sunni Islamic jurisprudence (Hanafi, Maliki, Shafi, and Hanbali). The chief mufti of each school of thought acted as the dean, responsible for the teachers and students in that group. During the time of the Ottomans, the Hanafi dean came to hold a position as primus inter pares. It also had membership from the seven main Sufi orders. Al-Azhar has had an antagonistic relationship with Wahhabism. According to a 2011 report issued by the Carnegie Endowment for International Peace, Al Azhar is strongly Sufi in character:
Adherence to a Sufi order has long been standard for both professors and students in the al-Azhar mosque and university system. Although al-Azhar is not monolithic, its identity has been strongly associated with Sufism. The current Shaykh al-Azhar (rector of the school), Ahmed el-Tayeb, is a hereditary Sufi shaykh from Upper Egypt who has recently expressed his support for the formation of a world Sufi league; the former Grand Mufti of Egypt and senior al-Azhar scholar Ali Gomaa is also a highly respected Sufi master.

However, in the early 20th century, enlightened Modernist thinkers such as Muhammad Abduh led a reform of the curriculum, reintroducing a desire for legal reform through ijtihad. Subsequently, disputes were had between modernist intellectuals and traditionalists within al-Azhar. Al-Azhar now maintains a modernist position, advocating "Wasatiyya" (centrism), a reaction against the extreme textualism of many Wahhabi Salafi ideologues. Wasatiyya covers a range of thinkers, some of whom are liberal intellectuals with religious inclinations, preachers such as Yusuf al-Qaradawi and many members of the Muslim Brotherhood since the 2013 coup however, Al-Azhar has taken a position against the brotherhood.

The nineteenth and current Grand Mufti of Egypt and Al Azhar scholar, is Shawki Ibrahim Abdel-Karim Allam. The university is opposed to overt liberal reform of Islam and issued a fatwa against the liberal Ibn Rushd-Goethe mosque in Berlin because it banned face-covering veils such as burqa and niqab on its premises while allowing women and men to pray together. The fatwa encompassed all present and future liberal mosques.

Photo gallery

See also
 Islam in Egypt
 Organisation of Islamic Cooperation

References

Works cited

External links 

 Official website

Al-Azhar
Islam in Egypt
Islamic organizations
Islamic organisations based in Egypt
Religion in Egypt
Sunni Islam